The Court of the Vicar-General of the Province of York is responsible for granting Marriage Licences in the Province of York of the Church of England. The Vicar-General of the Province and Official Principal of the Consistory Court is distinct from the Dean of the Arches. The Registrar is the Registrar of the Chancery Court of York.

List of Vicars-General
PN Collier, QC 2008-
TAC Coningsby, QC 1980-2008
Rev'd Kenneth Elphinstone, QC 1972-1980
Walter Wigglesworth, QC 1944-1972
HB Vaisey, KC c.1938
Sir Philip Wilbraham Baker Wilbraham, Bt, 1915-1934
Rt Hon Sir Charles Cripps, KCVO 1900- [Lord Parmoor cr 1914]
Edmund Beckett, 1st Baron Grimthorpe, QC 1877-1900 s:Beckett, Edmund (DNB12)

See also
 Court of the Vicar-General of the Province of Canterbury

Church of England legislation
Ecclesiastical courts